Michael John Tomczak (born October 23, 1962) is a former American football player. Tomczak played quarterback for several National Football League (NFL) teams from 1985 through 1999, including the Chicago Bears, the Green Bay Packers, the Cleveland Browns, and the Pittsburgh Steelers.  He was the offensive coordinator for the Pittsburgh Power of the Arena Football League (AFL) until 2014 when they ceased operations.  Tomczak is considered to be the most successful NFL quarterback to have played most of his college career at Ohio State University.

Early life, family and education
Tomczak is of Polish descent.

He attended Thornton Fractional North in Calumet City, Illinois. He attended college at Ohio State University and played football for its football team, the Buckeyes.

Professional football

Chicago Bears
Tomczak went undrafted out of college and signed as an original free agent with the Chicago Bears.  He started no games his first year but did earn a Super Bowl ring, and saw playing time in Super Bowl XX on January 26, 1986, during the fourth quarter of the Bears' 46–10 win over the New England Patriots on the kickoff unit, where he was penalized for a facemask penalty. He was a member of the "Shuffling Crew" in the Bears' video for The Super Bowl Shuffle, mimicking playing guitar. He played for the Bears until 1990 starting 31 games and throwing for 31 touchdowns and 47 interceptions.

Green Bay Packers
Tomczak was signed by the Green Bay Packers after the 1990 season and started seven games, throwing 11 touchdown passes, 128 completions and 9 interceptions.  He was cut by the Packers on Monday, August 31, 1992 after not participating in training camp activities or appearing in the entire preseason due to a lengthy contract holdout.

Pittsburgh Steelers
After spending a year with the Green Bay Packers and another with the Cleveland Browns, he signed with the Pittsburgh Steelers and spent seven seasons with the team, starting for much of the 1996 season and helping to guide the team into the playoffs. He started occasionally throughout his last three seasons with the Steelers, spelling Kordell Stewart for long stretches of the year in 1999.

After his contract with Pittsburgh was not renewed, he signed with the Detroit Lions in 2000 but suffered a broken right tibia in an exhibition game against the Oakland Raiders. After being forced to sit out the entire season, he retired from football, the last remaining active player from the 1985 Bears team. When asked about this, he replied, "Well, I had my run and I think it's time for new rookies to take my place on this team."

For his career, Tomczak had 73 starts, completed 55.3% of his passes for 88 touchdowns and 106 interceptions.

Career highlights
Among Tomczak's NFL career highlights, he won his first 10 starts at quarterback, all with Chicago, which set an NFL Record (breaking the mark set by former Pittsburgh Steeler Mike Kruczek). The mark was eventually topped by former Steeler QB Ben Roethlisberger. In 1988, Tomczak was the starting QB for Chicago in the infamous "Fog Bowl" playoff game against the Philadelphia Eagles, guiding the Bears to a 20-12 victory that put them in the NFC Championship Game. Tomczak started the last 15 games of the regular season, plus two playoff games, for Pittsburgh in 1996. The Steelers won 11 of those games, losing in the playoffs to eventual AFC champions, the New England Patriots. In his final regular season game, Pittsburgh lost a shoot-out against the Tennessee Titans 47-36, the highest scoring game in the history of Three Rivers Stadium. Tomczak passed for 309 yards and 2 touchdowns in his final game.

NFL career statistics

Post NFL career 
Tomczak worked as a sports announcer in Pittsburgh, as well as a color commentator for ESPN college football games, before becoming a sports management agent.  In 2001, he appeared on the sitcom Yes, Dear as himself.  He is a director at SMG Sports Management and has continued to work as a sports commentator.

Tomczak was the offensive coordinator for the Pittsburgh Power of the Arena Football League from 2010-2014. Tomczak has served as a volunteer coach, with Division I-AA Youngstown State University, since 2017.

Legal trouble
In late April 2010 he was arrested and charged with two counts of simple assault for "lunging at his wife, grabbing her and stepping on her foot." The charges were dropped on May 4, 2010.

References

External links
 

1962 births
Living people
American football quarterbacks
Chicago Bears players
Cleveland Browns players
College football announcers
Detroit Lions players
Green Bay Packers players
Ohio Dominican Panthers football coaches
Ohio State Buckeyes football players
Pittsburgh Steelers players
People from Calumet City, Illinois
Sportspeople from the Chicago metropolitan area
Players of American football from Illinois
American people of Polish descent
Ed Block Courage Award recipients